Secreto a voces (Open Secret) was a Chilean TV talk show focusing on show business and broadcast on the Mega TV network.  It was hosted by Mario Velasco and Karla Constant with the assistance of a group of panelists who pose questions to invited celebrity guests and contribute analysis.  The 90-minute show was last broadcast weekdays at noon.

History

Around the beginning of 2011, discussion began about a new prime time show to be called Placer culpable (Guilty Pleasure) and which would be hosted by Julio César Rodríguez.  As time went on plans crystallized, the show was named Secreto a Voces and Giancarlo Petaccia was named as host along with a four-member panel who would pose questions to invited guests.  The first broadcast was on February 3, 2011 with invited guests Raquel Calderón and Eduardo Cruz-Johnson.  Petaccia remained as host until the end of 2012 and was replaced by Karla Constant and Mario Velasco.

In 2012 and 2013, the show went through a number of changes in broadcast time and in the makeup of the panel, ending up in the 7:30 prime time slot where it faced tough ratings competition against Alfombra Roja (Red Carpet) on Canal 13 and the blockbuster Somos los Carmona (We Are the Carmonas) on TVN.  In September 2013, amidst rumors that the show would be canceled, it was rescheduled to the noon time slot, where it would face off against The Simpsons on Canal 13, as well as the top-rated entertainment talk show SQV on Chilevisión which traditionally had occupied that slot.

A shakeup in July 2014 shifted the program format away from mostly opinion to include more investigation and reporting.  As part of that, changes in staff were made including adding Karla Constant as host instead of Pamela Diaz and changing some panel members.  In the months following, ratings for 2014 rose half a point, and a full point since 2013.

The last show was broadcast on October 13, 2014.

Cast and crew

Hosts
Current
 Mario Velasco (2012- )
 Karla Constant (2014- )

Former
 Giancarlo Petaccia (2011–12)
 Pamela Díaz (2012-2014)

Panel members
Final
 Margarita Hantke
 Manuel González (2014- )
 Patricia Maldonado (2011-2012, 2014-présent)
 Pablo Zúñiga (2012- )
 Paula Escobar

Former
 Pamela Díaz 
 Javiera Suárez
 Andrés Baile
 Catalina Palacios
 Yamna Lobos
 Esteban Morais
 Patricia Maldonado
 Andrés Mendoza
 María Luisa Cordero
 Katherine Bodis
 Rocío Marengo
 Rubén Selman
 Vasco Moulian
 Vanessa Miller
 Eduardo Bonvallet
 Alejandra Valle

Journalists and reporters
Final
 Yiro Gatica
 Carolina Gatica
 Valeria Uberuaga
 Maria Ignacia Rocha
 Daniela Aliste 
 Gerald Paredes

Former
 Karina Pichara
 Carolina Rojas
 Francisco Kaminski (2012)

Production
 Director : Mauro Caro
 Executive Producer : Gonzalo Cordero
 Producer : Rodolfo Saavedra
 News editor : Clara Tapia

See also

 Television in Chile
 Mega (Chilean television channel)

References

External links
 Official site   (archived)

2010s Chilean television series
Chilean television talk shows
2011 Chilean television series debuts
2014 Chilean television series endings
Mega (Chilean TV channel) original programming